It Must Be Magic is the fourth studio album by Teena Marie, released on May 14, 1981. It was her last album for Motown and the highest-selling of Marie's tenure with Motown. The album peaked at No. 2 on the US Black Albums chart and No. 23 on the Pop Albums chart.

Lead single "Square Biz" became her most commercially successful for the label - peaking at No. 3 on Billboard's Black Singles chart and No. 12 on Billboard's Club Play Singles, while performing moderately on Billboard's Pop Singles, peaking at No. 50, becoming her second single to chart on the Pop Singles chart. This was followed up by No. 30 US Black Singles success for the title track, featuring label mates The Temptations, and the Quiet storm classic "Portuguese Love".

Like Irons in the Fire, it was fully written and produced by Marie herself, and received a positive critical reception, earning the album a nomination for Best Female R&B Vocal Performance at the 1982 Grammy Awards.

In 2002, the album was re-released in a remastered and expanded CD edition containing three additional tracks (two of which were recorded during a live concert in Long Beach, California).

Track listing 
All songs written by Teena Marie, except where noted.
 "It Must Be Magic" – 6:07
 "Revolution" – 4:27
 "Where's California" – 5:24
 "365" – 4:10
 "Opus III (Does Anybody Care)" – 1:27
 "Square Biz" (Marie, Allen McGrier) – 6:40
 "The Ballad of Cradle Rob and Me" (Marie, Jill D. Jones) – 3:24
 "Portuguese Love" – 7:17
 "Yes Indeed" – 4:57
Bonus tracks - 2002 Expanded Edition
 "Square Biz [Instrumental]" – 6:40 (expanded edition)
 "Someday We'll All Be Free" (Donny Hathaway/Edward Howard) – 1:57 (expanded edition - live recording)
 "Déjà Vu" (Rick James) – 12:26 (expanded edition - live recording)

Personnel
 Teena Marie - Lead and Backing Vocals, Synthesizer
 Patrice Rushen, Scott Markus DeTurk, James S. Stewart Jr. - Keyboards
 Allen McGrier, Oscar Alston, Charles A. Glenn Jr. - Bass
 Tom McDermott, Josef Andre Parson - Guitar
 Paul Hines - Drums
 Bill Wolfer, Allen McGrier - Synthesizer
 Lloyd Lindroth - Harp
 Daniel LeMelle - Saxophone
 Gerald Albright - Saxophone, Tenor Flute
 John Ervin - Trombone, Flute
 Eric Butler, Kenneth Scott - Trumpet
 Cliff Ervin, Roy Poper - Piccolo Trumpet
 Rick James, Diedra Joseph, Glenn Carl Leonard, Jackie Ruffin, Jill D. Jones, Melvin Franklin, Mickey Boyce Hearn, Otis Williams, Julia Waters, Maxine Waters, Pattie Brooks, Anthony Brockert, Christopher Anthony Boehme, Diedra Joseph, Dwayne Wedlan, Ginny Pallante, Grayland Taylor, Ray Townsend - Backing Vocals

Charts

Weekly charts

Year-end charts

Singles

Certifications

Later Samples
 "Square Biz"
 "Firm Biz" by The Firm from their self-titled album
 "Crip Hop" by Tha Eastsidaz from the album Duces 'n Trayz: The Old Fashioned Way
 "Love U So" by Mase from the album Harlem World
 "Portuguese Love"
 "Child of the Night" ft. Nate Dogg by Ludacris from The Red Light District

External links
 Teena Marie-It Must Be Magic at Discogs

References

Teena Marie albums
1981 albums
Motown albums